Beaurepaire is a country estate at Sherborne St John in the English county of Hampshire.

History 
Beaurepaire was owned by the Brocas family from Aquitaine for approximately 500 years.

In the 14th century, Sir John Brocas was Edward III's Master of the Horse.  In 1369, Edward permitted John's son, Bernard, to enclose the parkland and create the Beaurepaire estate.  As a knight, Bernard was favoured by Edward, the Black Prince, and accompanied him during the Battle of Poitiers.  Bernard later became Chief Surveyor and Sovereign Warden of the parks at Winchester College; he was acquainted with the college's founder, William of Wykeham.

The house suffered considerable damage during the Civil War and was later rebuilt in 1777. The house is moated with access over small bridges: the white iron gates to the main bridge were designed by Sir John Soane.

Recent history 
The estate was sold by the Brocas family in 1873.  In 1941, the building was largely destroyed by fire.  The Tudor servants wing, however, survived. The owner at the time of the fire, Sir Strati Ralli, was unable to restore or repair the house due to wartime restriction of building materials.

In 1959, the house was bought by Roger Makins, 1st Baron Sherfield who lived in nearby Sherfield.  Makins commissioned Tom Bird (an architect who worked at the offices of Maxwell Fry) to restore the building.  The building was further renovated by Makins's son, Dwight, who added a cloister garden with battlements and crow-stepped gables. The house is now a Grade II listed building.

In the early 21st century, the estate was put up for sale.

References 

Country houses in Hampshire
Basingstoke and Deane